St Vincent De Paul Church(SVP) is a Roman Catholic church located in Katapady in Udupi district, Karnataka
, India.

History
The church was established on 18 May 1948 by Rev Fr Rosario Fernades. The present church building was built by Rev Fr John A P Miranda in 1957. Starting in the year 2000's the church has been run by priests from Congregation of Holy Cross.

List of Priests who served here

 Fr Rosario Fernandes
 Fr J.P Tellis
 Fr A.F D'souza
 Fr John A.P Miranda
 Fr Frederick Lobo
 Fr Golbert Noranha
 Fr Charles D'souza
 Fr Arthur C.A D'souza
 Fr John Fernandes
 Fr Henry Fernandes
 Fr Wilfred Fernandes
 Fr Norbert D'mello
 Asst Fr Aloysius Gonsalves
 Fr Ronald Fernades
 Fr Lawrence D'almedia
 Fr Ronson D'Souza

References

Roman Catholic Diocese of Udupi